Rosemary Clooney Sings the Music of Harold Arlen is a 1983 album by Rosemary Clooney, of songs composed by Harold Arlen. The album was the first of five to feature guitarist Ed Bickert, and it also featured longtime Clooney collaborators Scott Hamilton, Warren Vaché Jr., and Jake Hanna. The album is also the only small-group album in her Concord discography not to feature either Nat Pierce or John Oddo on piano. Instead, Dave McKenna, who had a long-established solo career as a jazz pianist, joined Clooney for the album.

Track listing
 "Hooray for Love" (Leo Robin) – 3:09
 "Happiness is a Thing Called Joe" (Yip Harburg) – 4:32
 "One for My Baby (and One More for the Road)" (Johnny Mercer) – 3:46
 "Get Happy" (Ted Koehler) – 3:05
 "Ding-Dong! The Witch Is Dead" (Harburg) – 3:23
 "Out of This World" (Mercer) – 4:56
 "My Shining Hour" (Mercer) – 3:48
 "Let's Take the Long Way Home" (Mercer) – 3:31
 "Stormy Weather" (Koehler) – 5:41

All music by Harold Arlen, lyricists indicated.

Personnel
 Rosemary Clooney – vocals
 Scott Hamilton – tenor saxophone
 Warren Vaché Jr.
 Dave McKenna – piano
 Ed Bickert – guitar
 Steve Wallace – bass 
 Jake Hanna – drums

References

1983 albums
Concord Records albums
Harold Arlen tribute albums
Rosemary Clooney albums